Aïn Khadra is a town and commune in the northwest of M'Sila Province, Algeria.

References

Communes of M'Sila Province